Operation Giant Lance was an undercover military operation by the United States in which the primary objective was to apply military pressure towards the Soviet Union during the Cold War. Initiated on October 27, 1969, President Richard Nixon authorized a squadron of 18 B-52 bombers to patrol the Arctic polar ice caps and escalate the nuclear threat posed. The goal was to coerce both the Soviet Union and North Vietnam to agree on favourable terms with the US, and conclusively end the Vietnam War. The operation's effectiveness was also largely built on Nixon's consistent madman theory diplomacy, in order to influence Moscow's decision even more. The operation was kept top secret from both the general public and higher authorities within the Strategic Air Command, intended to only be noticed by Russian intelligence. The operation lasted one month before being called off.

Background

State of the Vietnam War 
Tensions from the Vietnam war remained high and served as a large catalyst behind Nixon's deployment of the operation. The war was one of Nixon's primary objectives in his entrance to the office and led to Nixon devising a plan to both end the Vietnam war and gain international and domestic credibility for the United States as a result. By launching the Operation Giant Lance offensive, Nixon aimed to increase tensions within the war by raising the United States' nuclear threat through a "show of force" alert. These operations acted as a prequel to Nixon's eventual Operation Duck Hook, declassified in 2005. The primary goal of these operations was to pressure the Soviets in Moscow to call upon their North Vietnamese ally for favorable peace terms for the United States. With Operation Duck Hook being declassified in 2005, it was revealed that the "show of force" alert, including Operation Giant Lance, was meant to prepare for any military confrontation from the Soviets.

Preparation 
Earle Wheeler, a United States Army general, ordered the operation as a part of the raised nuclear alert. Under secrecy, Operation Giant Lance was a part of numerous escalations of nuclear threat, launched according to Nixon and Wheeler's decision to initiate a "Show of Force" alert on the 10th of October 1969. This was a series of operations to increase military pressure, including the airborne Operation Giant Lance. Initiated on October 13, eighteen B-52 bomber aircraft were deployed in preparation for the operation, requiring accompanying KC-135 tankers to refuel and support the extended patrol of the squadron. To prepare for the operation, the Strategic Air Command (SAC) were used to collaboratively deploy the aircraft from air bases both in California and Washington State in secrecy. Further increasing the readiness of the bombers, the aircraft were checked throughout the day, standing by for immediate deployment.

Purpose 
The purpose of Operation Giant Lance was to intimidate the foreign contenders in the Vietnam War, primarily the Soviets through a display of radical military escalation. By using seemingly irrational actions as a part of Nixon's madman diplomacy, he aimed to push both the Soviet and the Vietnamese to end the war on favourable terms. This operation utilised a squadron of eighteen B-52 bomber aircraft which posed an extreme nuclear threat. These bombers were to patrol the Northern polar ice caps to survey the frozen terrain, whilst armed with nuclear weaponry. The patrols consisted of eighteen-hour long vigils, which were executed with the intention of appearing as suspicious movements from the US. These movements were kept secret from the public, whilst also remaining intentionally detectable to the Soviet Union's intelligence systems. The operation was also intended to be a precautionary measure boasting operational readiness in case of military retaliation from either East Asia or Russia. The operation's intended goal was also to directly support project Duck Hook as a part of the 'Show of Force' alert. Nixon believed that this would indirectly coerce Moscow and Hanoi to enter a peace treaty through the Paris peace talks with the Soviets, on terms that were advantageous to the United States. This outcome was also thought to possibly benefit the United States as well by promoting the credibility of the United States intervention in the Sino-Soviet conflict to its general public in the war.

Madman theory 
President Richard Nixon was infamous for his radical measures which heavily influenced his diplomatic course of actions. The radicality of sending eighteen armed bombers on patrol stemmed from Nixon's intention to pressure foreign forces by displaying extreme military prowess. Henry Kissinger, the national security advisor, was advised by Nixon at this time about Nixon's willingness to use nuclear weapons in order to end the war. This madman theory attributed president Nixon with a type of diplomacy in which he would often take irrational options, even to the United States' own authorities. This perception allows foreign forces to be unable to predict Nixon's intended motives or whether he would execute his actions, allowing Nixon to have a unique strategic advantage. This diplomacy served as an indirect threat coupled with Nixon's decision to raise the nuclear alert, as the Soviets would not be able to completely understand his course of action. Nixon used this unpredictable diplomacy in a failed attempt to end the war in Vietnam, specifically constructing the impression he was willing to take desperate measures and irrationally threaten enemy forces with the United States' excessive nuclear threat. This would result in an increased possibility that they may abide by the United States' demands on the basis that Nixon would declare nuclear warfare if his threats were not complied with. The operations elevating the nuclear threat would also act as a display of Nixon's reputability as a tough and "mad" leader. This was intended to lead both the North Vietnamese and Soviets that he was indeed an irrational leader, capable of escalating the nuclear threat. The policy failed to produce the concessions desired by the United States. 

Due to Nixon's history of enacting this diplomacy such as the Cuban Missile Crisis, the threat of his "madman" actions served as a real warning as he was socially recognized as a madman figure. This diplomacy was in effect briefly during the Vietnam war due to the growing fear over the usage of nuclear warfare, amplified by the numerous 'Show of Force' operations. Although this diplomacy could have been passed off to foreign forces as a bluff, the risk of uncertainty to them is much larger than the risk to the United States. Ultimately, Nixon possessed an objective advantage as the US could gauge the effectiveness of their threats based on the reactionary implications of both the Soviets and Vietnamese.

Implications

Giant Lance's success 
The operation did not directly cause any obvious, significant change due to its cancellation; the impact it may have had on the Soviets or the Vietnamese cannot be accurately measured. The operation was terminated on October 30 suddenly without any known reason. The abrupt halt to the operation may have been due to the fact that the Soviets did not show any significant changes in their actions, which could be speculated that the Soviets suspected Nixon of his bluffs, thus undermining the overall success of the operation. However, other historians have argued that the sudden withdrawal of the SAC's squadron was an intentional effort to display the maneuverability and freedom the US possessed when it came to nuclear warfare.

Operation Giant Lance would later be revealed to be a tool in terms of escalating the nuclear threat towards the Soviets and North Vietnamese. Giant Lance was intended to jar foreign forces into favourable diplomatic agreements to end the war, before it led to Nixon's decision to carry out Operation Duck Hook. Despite the operation ending as a bluff tactic, the operation served to add credibility both to Nixon's madman threats and the proactiveness of the US. Despite this, this may have not amounted to much success due to the large anti-war movement at the time, which served as a large catalyst to the reprieve of the nuclear operations. Seymour Hersh, a modern journalist, believed that the operation also served as an underlying offensive to Operation Duck Hook, in case Nixon decided to carry out the mining and bombing operation.

In response to the patrols from Giant Lance, the Soviets showed no clear reactionary actions. Whilst there may not have been a direct response to Operation Giant Lance, there was a reaction from the Soviet intelligence due to the sudden heightened nuclear alert. This was effectively the goal of the operation, to remain publicly secretive but expose the movements purposely to the Soviet intelligence. Moscow did not undertake any steps towards the US despite this. Roger Dingman speculated that whilst the Soviets showed no reaction, the threat and Nixon's madman diplomacy may have impacted both the decisions of the Soviets and Vietnamese. The lack of any retaliation may be due to Nixon's history of his bluffs attributed to the madman diplomacy, in which previous nuclear alert threats such as the DEFCON alert initiated during the Cuban Missile Crisis served as a missile scare. In October 1973, a soviet official exclaimed that "Mr. Nixon used to exaggerate his intentions regularly. He used alerts and leaks to do this", which may have driven the avoidance of the US operational threat.

Social perception to nuclear warfare 
Although both Moscow and Hanoi did not show any reaction or impact of Operation Giant Lance, the uncertainty of Nixon's nuclear power posed a significant threat. As Nixon was socially recognised as a "madman", the risk of Nixon's continuous nuclear threat towards Hanoi was undermined by the anti-war sentiment on US home soil. This implied to Hanoi that the US did not wish for further war, or risk of nuclear warfare. The heightened fear of nuclear warfare brought upon a shared parity of nuclear avoidance across all participants of the war. Neither participant willed a military confrontation that would escalate to that level, exemplifying the significance and extreme measures of Nixon's "mad" actions in social perceptions at the time.

There also existed the political danger of nuclear reliance in terms of war, with increased usage of nuclear weaponry as a threat, other international governments would begin to accept this as the norm. Nuclear fear would bring the possibility of increased nuclear use both offensively and defensively as a means of protecting themselves, engaging or retaliating in military engagements. Continual development of nuclear technology and reliance would inevitably lead to increasing overall paranoia and risk of danger. Military escalation could lead to catastrophic implications, as the presence of nuclear warfare allows for “the threat that leaves something to chance”.

References

1969 in international relations
1969 in military history
October 1969 events in the United States
1969 in the Soviet Union
Giant Lance
Nuclear history of the United States
Nuclear warfare
Soviet Union–United States relations
Military operations of the Cold War
United States nuclear command and control
Presidency of Richard Nixon